Thomas Chudleigh may refer to:

Sir Thomas Chudleigh, 5th Baronet (died 1741), of the Chudleigh baronets
Thomas Clifford, 1st Baron Clifford of Chudleigh (1630 – 1673), English politician
Thomas Clifford, 14th Baron Clifford of Chudleigh (born 1948), British baron

See also
Chudleigh (disambiguation)